Simon Peter Ellis (born 18 May 1961) is an English songwriter, producer and musical director who has worked with the Spice Girls, Britney Spears, Westlife, S Club 7, East 17, and music mogul Simon Fuller. He co-wrote and produced the S Club 7 hits "Don't Stop Movin'", "Two in a Million", "Never Had a Dream Come True" and "Alive". "Don't Stop Movin'" won the ITV record of the year award in 2001 and the Brit Award for Best British Single 2002.

Personal life 
Born in Bradford, West Yorkshire, Simon lived with his mother and brother in his early years. Growing up he attended Swaine House School followed by Hanson School, before he then went on to study at Bradford Art School and Preston Art School where he graduated with a BA Honours in Graphic Design.

Simon harboured another passion besides Graphic Design. He was talented musically and taught himself to play piano from the age of 15. In the mid-80s Simon made the move to London to pursue a career in graphic design, but it was fate that intervened and he fell into the world of music.

Simon now resides in Hebden Bridge, Yorkshire with his wife and co-writer of hits from his past and present catalogue, and two adult children.

Career

Early career 
In 1988, Simon co-formed Ellis, Beggs & Howard. Supported by their debut album Homelands, the band had success across mainland Europe where their music sold in considerable numbers, gaining a modicum of success in the continent. Although the album failed to ignite the public consciousness in the UK, it was their distinctive sounding first single, 'Big Bubbles, No Troubles', which broached the UK charts, peaking at Number 41. The band split around 1990 during the sessions for a second album.

After the split, Simon continued trying to make a living in music for three years, meeting his future wife, Johanne along the way, who was soon expecting their first child.

In 1994, Simon took up his first musical director job with the band D:Ream, who had hits such as 'Things Can Only Get Better' and 'U R The Best Thing'. He toured with them for a couple of years until he then went to join East 17 as part of their live  band on promotional tours.

Work with Spice Girls 
In 1997, Ellis got his major break as a musical director when was head hunted by Simon Fuller for the then new project, The Spice Girls. Fuller brought Ellis into the world of 19 Management and gave him the job as the girls musical director. Ellis made numerous TV appearances with the girls, and was the mastermind behind all of their concerts and world tours through to 2019. Due to commitments with the band Westlife in the summer of 2019, Simon didn't MD the Spice World – 2019 Tour.

Work with S Club 7 
The producer has had a long-standing collaboration with English band, S Club 7, dating back to the late 1990s. This artistic partnership resulted in him co-writing and producing three top five UK singles, including two no.1's. He has toured with the band on all of their live concerts tours as the musical director.

Work with Britney Spears 
During 2009, Ellis was appointed the role of Musical Director for Britney Spears's The Circus Starring Britney Spears, consequently leading on to 2011 when he once again was asked to MD for Spears' Femme Fatale Tour.

Work with Westlife 
In 2019 Simon reunited with Westlife who he's worked with on two of their past concert tours − Where We Are Tour (2010) & Gravity Tour (2011), and was appointed the musical director for their come back 2019 The Twenty Tour. This continued into 2020 for which Simon was their MD and keyboard player for the Stadiums in the Summer Tour.

Simon continues to write and produce music for new and already established artists, and is actively working as a Musical Director.

Concert tours 
Simon has been involved as the musical director, mixer and/or keyboard player in all of the following concert tours, gigs and TV appearances:

Britney Spears 

 The Circus Starring Britney Spears (2009)
 Femme Fatale (2011)

Emma Bunton 
 Emma Bunton The Christmas Show (2022)

Spice Girls 
 Girl Power! Live in Istanbul (1997)
 Spiceworld (1998)
Christmas in Spiceworld (1999)
 The Return of The Spice Girls (2007–08)
 London Olympics Closing Ceremony (2012)

S Club 7 

 S Club Party (2001–02)
 Carnival Tour (2002)
 S Club United Tour with S Club Juniors (2003)
 Bring It All Back (2015)
 S Club 7 Reunited (2023)

Westlife 

 Gravity Tour (2011)
 Greatest Hits Tour (2012)
 The Twenty Tour (2019)
 The Wild Dreams Tour (2022-23)

Awards and nominations

ITV Record of the Year 

|-
| rowspan="1"| 2001
| "Don't Stop Movin'"
|The Record of the Year
|

Brit Award 

|-
| rowspan="1"| 2002
| "Don't Stop Movin'"
|Best British Single – Writer & Producer
|

The Ivor Novello Awards 

|-
| rowspan="1"| 2001
| "Never Had a Dream Come True"
|Best Song Musically and Lyrically
|

References

External links 
Simon Ellis Music (official website)
19 Entertainment
Brit Awards

Living people
1961 births
English record producers
English songwriters
Music directors
Musicians from Bradford
Musicians from London